Hermanis is a Latvian masculine given name and surname and may refer to:

Given name 
Hermanis Matisons (1894–1932), Latvian chess player
Hermanis Saltups (1901–1968), Latvian footballer

Surname 
Alvis Hermanis (born 1965), Latvian actor, theatre director and set designer

References

Latvian masculine given names
Latvian-language masculine surnames